, commonly known as just Glico, is a Japanese multinational food processing company headquartered in Nishiyodogawa-ku, Osaka.  It does business across 30 countries, in North America, Asia-Pacific and Europe.

Overview 
Ezaki Glico's primary business is manufacturing confectionery products such as chocolate, chips, chewing gums and ice cream, and dairy products. Additionally, Glico manufactures processed foods such as curry stocks and retort takikomi gohan pouch, and dietary supplement products.

Ezaki Glico's main financier was Sanwa Bank, which was merged into the Bank of Tokyo-Mitsubishi UFJ.  Ezaki Glico is a member of Midori Kai, a group of companies whose main financier was Sanwa Bank.

Corporate message
"Good Taste and Good Health" (おいしさと健康, 1971—1992)
"A Wholesome Life in the Best of Taste" (1992—, message in Japanese "おいしさと健康" is still in use)

History

Japan 
In 1919, Riichi Ezaki created a caramel candy product containing glycogen extracted from oysters.  The caramel candy product was named "Cuchieco". The sales copy of this product was "300 Meters in a Single Piece," and a running man was painted on the package.  On February 11, 1922 Riichi started selling Glico products at Mitsukoshi Osaka branch.

Later, in 1922, Riichi established a company, Ezaki Glico Co., Ltd Glico is the shorted word for glycogen.  Its Osaka Factory and Tokyo Factory were destroyed during World War II, and they were reopened in 1951. Popular products like Pretz and Pocky were introduced in 1963 and 1966 respectively.

In 1984, Glico Morinaga case, a series of criminal incidents targeting Japanese major food manufacturers, occurred. Ezaki Glico was one of the victims. Targeted by a group known as "The Monster with 21 Faces", the group claimed that $21 million ($2.26 billion Yen) worth of sweets were laced with Potassium cyanide soda, while Katsuhisa Ezaki, President and CEO, was kidnapped but escaped by himself. Ezaki Glico was blackmailed and its office was burned by the criminals.

Products
Ezaki Glico manufactures a wide variety of products. Major products are listed here.

Confections

TCHO, Berkeley, California based artisanal chocolate manufacturer of various chocolate bars.
Glico, caramel product.  In addition to the standard flavor, there are caramel flavor and crushed almond flavor products.  
Pocky, chocolate-coated pretzel sticks, which come in many other flavors.  The total sales from 1966 exceeds 10 billion packages.  In Europe, this product is sold with the "Mikado" brand.
Pretz, pretzel sticks, which come in many other flavors.
Almond Chocolate, almonds coated by chocolate.
Caplico, frosting-dipped waffle biscuits in the shape of ice cream cones that come in either chocolate or strawberry flavor.
Bisco, wheat germ crackers with yogurt cream using special yeast.
BREO, an oral care candy that was developed for cleaning the tongue and breath.

Dairy products
Pucchin Pudding, the world's best-selling pudding product.  Its characteristic is a special package with which consumers can efficiently move the contents on a plate.

Ice-cream products
Giant Cone, ice cream in a large cone with crisp chocolate and nut toppings.
Panapp, vanilla ice cream in a handy long cup with fruit sauce fillings in the centre.
Papico, sherbet that comes in tubes.
, bite-sized round ice candies.  Ezaki Glico promoted this product by an extremely realistic CG character, Aimi Eguchi, who was created using facial features from members of the pop girl group, AKB48.
Calorie Control Ice Cream series, which uses lower-calorie sweetening agents maltitol and sucralose in place of sugar and starch syrup often used in ice cream. Tofu is also used to replace dairy products to lower the amount of calories.
Seventeen Ice, a brand of ice cream coming in over 20 different flavors which is only available in vending machines.

Processed foods
Ni-dan Juku Curry, cubed-type Japanese-style curry stock.
Donburi-tei, instant donburi retort pouch product.

Cream stew roux.

Baby formula
ICREO Balance Milk, a powdered baby formula manufactured by Icreo Co., Ltd.

Advertisement

Ezaki Glico's large LED sign located above Dōtonbori in Osaka has been a landmark of the city since its initial construction in 1935. It bears the Glico running man on a blue race track, as well as some of Osaka's other landmarks in the background. The giant neon sign has been revised on several occasions in order to celebrate events such as the World Cup and to bolster team spirit for Osaka's baseball team, the Hanshin Tigers.  As the sign is quite well known, it has long been a popular photo stop for tourists as well as locals.

Ezaki Glico was also the main sponsor of the anime series Tetsujin 28 (1963—1966, the original Japanese version of Gigantor).

See also
Aimi Eguchi, CGI pop idol created by Glico
Pocky & Pretz Day, November 11 each year
Panasonic, Glico's one-time shareholder
Glico Morinaga case
Dōtonbori

References

Materials

External links

 Glico Global Official Site
 Ezaki Glico Official website

Companies listed on the Tokyo Stock Exchange
Companies based in Osaka Prefecture
Food and drink companies established in 1929
Confectionery companies of Japan
Multinational companies headquartered in Japan
Multinational food companies
Japanese brands
Midori-kai
Snack food manufacturers of Japan
Japanese companies established in 1929